Ghizdita may refer to:

Ghizdita, a village in Mânzălești Commune, Buzău County, Romania
Ghizdita, a village in Fîntîniţa Commune, Drochia district, Moldova